Access Business Academy, located in South Africa, began in 1986 and has since expanded to include campuses at Port Elizabeth, East London, Pretoria North and Brits. Access also runs a distance education division as well as a Theological Department in collaboration with the Nelson Mandela Metropolitan University Theological Department. Access is also involved in Corporate Training.

Ranking

External links
Official Site

Business schools in South Africa
Educational institutions established in 1986
1986 establishments in South Africa